Bloodline is the second album by the R&B group LeVert, released in 1986. It was their first album for Atlantic Records.

The album reached number eight on the Billboard R&B Albums chart.

Critical reception
The Los Angeles Times wrote that "this trio is fully committed to melody and feeling, making for an effective update of the sweet sounds associated with the street harmonizing the O'Jays themselves started with more than 25 years ago."

Track listing
"(Pop, Pop, Pop, Pop) Goes My Mind" (Gerald LeVert, Marc Gordon)  5:54
"Fascination" (Gerald LeVert, Marc Gordon, James Mtume) 4:29
"Pose" (Wilmer Raglin, Jr., William F. Zimmermann)  6:12
"I Start You Up, You Turn Me On" (James Mtume)  4:31
"Kiss and Make Up" - (Gerald LeVert, Marc Gordon)  4:45
"Let's Go Out Tonight" (Gerald LeVert)   5:17
"Grip" (Gerald LeVert)  5:57	
"Looking for Love" (Gerald LeVert, Marc Gordon)  5:17

Personnel

LeVert
Gerald LeVert - Keyboards, Lead and Backing Vocals
Sean LeVert -  Percussion
Marc Gordon - Keyboards, Backing Vocals

Additional Personnel
James Mtume - Keyboards, Backing Vocals
Craig Cooper - Guitar, Keyboards
Mike Ferguson, Ricky Brown - Bass
David T. Walker, Ed Moore, Rob Cunningham - Guitar
Ramsey Embick, William Zimmerman - Keyboards
Paulinho Da Costa - Percussion
Philip Field - Keyboards
Tawatha Agee, Tyrone Brunson - Backing Vocals

Charts

Singles

References

External links
 

1986 albums
LeVert albums
Atlantic Records albums